The Amurian Plate (or Amur Plate; also occasionally referred to as the China Plate, not to be confused with the South China Subplate) is a minor tectonic plate in the northern and eastern hemispheres. It covers northeastern China, the Korean Peninsula, the Sea of Japan, Shikoku, Kyushu, southwest Honshu (Kansai, Chūgoku), eastern Mongolia and the south of Russian Far East. Once thought to be a part of the Eurasian Plate, the Amurian Plate is now generally considered to be a separate plate moving southeast with respect to the Eurasian Plate.  
The Amurian Plate is named after the Amur River, which forms the border between the Russian Far East and Northeast China.
It is bounded on the north, west, and southwest by the Eurasian Plate, on the east by the Okhotsk Plate, to the southeast by  the Philippine Sea Plate along the Suruga Trough and the Nankai Trough, and the Okinawa Plate, and the Yangtze Plate.

The Baikal Rift Zone is considered a boundary between the Amurian Plate and the Eurasian Plate.  GPS measurements indicate that the plate is slowly rotating counterclockwise. The boundary between the Okhotsk Plate is the eastern margin of the Sea of Japan.

The Amurian Plate may have been involved in the 1975 Haicheng earthquake and the 1976 Tangshan earthquake in China.

See also
 North China Craton

References

Further reading 
 Dongping Wei and Tetsuzo Seno. 1998. Determination of the Amurian Plate Motion. Mantle Dynamics and Plate Interactions in East Asia, Geodynamics Series. v.27, edited by M. F. J. Flower et al., 419p, AGU, Washington D.C. (abstract )

Tectonic plates
Geology of Japan
Geology of China
Geology of Korea
Geology of North Korea
Geology of South Korea
Geology of the Russian Far East
Geology of the Pacific Ocean